Jasmine Jessica Anthony is an American actress. She made her debut in the 2002 film Catch Me If You Can. In 2005, she was cast as Amy Calloway in the ABC drama series Commander in Chief.

Filmography

Film
 Catch Me If You Can (2002) ... Little Girl
 Stop Thief! (2004) ... Young Sophie
 Checking Out (2005) ... Young Flo Applebaum
 Little Athens (2005) ... Katie Kinney
 Rodeo Girl (2006) ... Heather
 Dead Write (2007) ... Heather
 1408 (2007) ... Katie Enslin
 The Butterfly Room (2012) ... Young Dorothy
 Unbelievable!!!!!  (2014) ... Eileen Dover

Television
 Star Trek: Enterprise (2005) ... Tallah
 Monk ... Season 4 episode 2 "Mr. Monk Goes Home Again" (2005 July 15) ... Witch Girl
 Commander in Chief (2005–2006) ... Amy Calloway
 Medium (2007) ... Young Girl
 My Name Is Earl (2007) ... Classmate
 State of Mind (2007) ... Ella
 Ugly Betty (2007) ... Antonella
 Wedding Band (2013) ... Flower Girl
 Black-ish (2015) ... Teen Girl

Awards

References

External links

American child actresses
American television actresses
People from Tarzana, Los Angeles
Living people
American film actresses
Actresses from Los Angeles
21st-century American actresses
Year of birth missing (living people)